Elwood is a city in Madison and Tipton counties in the U.S. state of Indiana. The Madison County portion, which includes most of the city, is part of the Anderson, Indiana Metropolitan Statistical Area, while the small portion in Tipton County is part of the Kokomo, Indiana Metropolitan Statistical Area. The population was 8,614 at the 2010 census.

History 
Elwood was laid out in 1853 under the name Duck Creek. It was incorporated as a city in 1891.

A post office was established under the name Duck Creek in 1855, was renamed to Elwood in 1869, and has been operating since.

By the 1880s, Elwood had become a sundown town, prohibiting Black people from residing within the town. In 1897, when a number of Black families attempted to settle in the town and they were driven out. The Evening Times, in Washington D.C., reported that for more than two decades Black people had not been “permitted to remain any length of time.” This prohibition remained in place for most of the 20th century.

Elwood native Wendell Willkie accepted nomination by the Republican party for the 1940 presidential election by holding a large rally of close to 150,000 in the community. Although some prominent Black reporters, such as Marse Callaway of Baltimore, were allowed to briefly stay in a hotel downtown, others were unable to stay the night due to the community’s sundown status. Other Black people were discouraged from attempting to attend the rally at all due to the sundown signs posted at the city limits. These signs and policies remained in place for decades afterwards.

By the late twentieth century sundown policies were less strictly enforced, although as recently as 2002 law enforcement in nearby Marion considered Elwood to still be unwelcoming of Black people. In 2015, after Goshen, Indiana, passed a resolution acknowledging its history as a sundown town, Elwood’s own past became a topic of discussion. The mayor of Elwood stated that while he had had no knowledge of the racially exclusionary policies of Elwood’s past, he would address them if they were part of Elwood’s “lingering reputation.”

Elwood was the site of a great political event on August 17, 1940.  The Republican National Committee held a formal notification ceremony to recognize Elwood-born Wendell Willkie as its nominee for President of the United States to run against Franklin Roosevelt.  Held at Callaway Park on the outskirts of town, the ceremony drew 150,000 people for what would become the largest political rally in American history at the time.  People came in 60,000 automobiles, 63 special trains, 300 Pullmans, and 1,200 buses.  The Indiana University band led a parade in which 249 other bands also marched in the procession.  When Willkie stepped onto the platform, the crowd cheered him for ten minutes before he could begin his speech.  However, oppressive heat and Willkie's underwhelming, flat speech left many disappointed by the end of the day.

Geography 
Elwood is located at  (40.274109, -85.838047).

Demographics

2010 census
As of the census of 2010, there were 8,614 people, 3,455 households, and 2,265 families living in the city. The racial makeup of the city was 96.7% White, 0.2% African American, 0.2% Native American, 0.3% Asian, 1.0% from other races, and 1.5% from two or more races. Hispanic or Latino of any race were 3.3% of the population.

There were 3,455 households, of which 33.1% had children under the age of 18 living with them, 44.8% were married couples living together, 14.8% had a female householder with no husband present, 6.0% had a male householder with no wife present, and 34.4% were non-families. 28.6% of all households were made up of individuals, and 12.5% had someone living alone who was 65 years of age or older. The average household size was 2.49 and the average family size was 3.02.

The median age in the city was 38.6 years. 25.2% of residents were under the age of 18; 8.5% were between the ages of 18 and 24; 24.1% were from 25 to 44; 28.1% were from 45 to 64; and 14.1% were 65 years of age or older. The gender makeup of the city was 48.7% male and 51.3% female.

2000 census
As of the census of 2000, there were 9,737 people, 3,845 households, and 2,660 families living in the city. The racial makeup of the city was 98.33% White, 0.05% African American, 0.12% Native American, 0.25% Asian, 0.05% Pacific Islander, 0.68% from other races, and 0.52% from two or more races. Hispanic or Latino of any race were 1.64% of the population.

There were 3,845 households, out of which 32.7% had children under the age of 18 living with them, 52.9% were married couples living together, 11.9% had a female householder with no husband present, and 30.8% were non-families. 26.9% of all households were made up of individuals, and 12.1% had someone living alone who was 65 years of age or older. The average household size was 2.50 and the average family size was 3.00.

In the city, the population was spread out, with 26.3% under the age of 18, 7.9% from 18 to 24, 28.8% from 25 to 44, 22.3% from 45 to 64, and 14.8% who were 65 years of age or older. The median age was 37 years. For every 100 females, there were 94.2 males. For every 100 females age 18 and over, there were 90.5 males.

The median income for a household in the city was $30,986, and the median income for a family was $36,239. Males had a median income of $31,527 versus $19,947 for females. The per capita income for the city was $15,402. About 11.7% of families and 15.2% of the population were below the poverty line, including 21.0% of those under age 18 and 9.4% of those age 65 or over.

Community and culture
The annual Glass Festival, held every third weekend of August, is one way in which the city tries to promote the area's history with natural gas and glass. In the years surrounding the turn of the century, Elwood, along with the nearby towns of Anderson and Gas City, was a common destination for Welsh immigrant families.

Elwood has a public library, a branch of the North Madison County Public Library System.

The Elwood Downtown Historic District was listed in the National Register of Historic Places in 2002.

Notable people
 David Canary, actor
 Jared Carter, poet
 Joseph Clancy, United States Secret Service agent and 24th Director of the agency
 James J. Davis, United States Secretary of Labor and U.S. Senator from Pennsylvania
 Don Mellett, newspaper editor
 John Mengelt, professional athlete, NBA
 Philip Sharp, U.S. Representative from Indiana
 Ray Still, contemporary classical oboist
 Wallace D. Wattles, writer
 Edward Willkie, Olympic wrestler
 Wendell Willkie, 1940 Republican presidential candidate
 Ryan Keene (aka "Fry Guy"), computer hacker

References

External links

 
 Glass Festival Information Center
 

Cities in Indiana
Cities in Madison County, Indiana
Cities in Tipton County, Indiana
Kokomo, Indiana metropolitan area
Sundown towns in Indiana